Rod Keogh (born 25 March 1971) is a former Australian rules footballer who played for the Melbourne Football Club and St Kilda Football Club in the Australian Football League (AFL).

Keogh usually played in the midfield or at half forward and was recruited to Melbourne from Castlemaine. He made his league debut in 1990 but spent most of the season with the reserves where he won a Gardiner Medal. In 1993 he won another Gardiner Medal after failing to play a senior game that year. He moved to St Kilda in 1994 and was a member of their 1997 grand final losing side. Keogh was delisted at the end of the 1998 season.

References

External links 
 

1971 births
Living people
Australian rules footballers from Victoria (Australia)
St Kilda Football Club players
Melbourne Football Club players
Castlemaine Football Club players
North Launceston Football Club coaches